Laylo Tilovova (born 8 March 1997) is an Uzbekistani footballer who plays as a goalkeeper for Women's Championship club Sevinch and the Uzbekistan women's national team.

See also
List of Uzbekistan women's international footballers

References 

1997 births
Living people
Women's association football goalkeepers
Uzbekistani women's footballers
People from Qashqadaryo Region
Uzbekistan women's international footballers
Uzbekistani women's futsal players
Futsal goalkeepers
20th-century Uzbekistani women
21st-century Uzbekistani women